CreditorWatch is an Australian credit reporting agency that manages the credit files of all commercial businesses in Australia.  It is a subscription based commercial company.

CreditorWatch aggregates data from a range of sources that include Australia's corporate regulator Australian Securities & Investments Commission (ASIC), ABR (Australian Business Register), courts, small claims courts, magistrates courts as well as adverse data provided by CreditorWatch users.

Businesses can use the service to perform credit checks on commercial entities, monitor client credit ratings, search potential debtors before offering credit and receive alerts when a default is lodged against a client. CreditorWatch also allows small businesses to expose clients who have failed to pay their invoices on time.
CreditorWatch is an ASIC-approved information broker.

History 

CreditorWatch was founded in October 2010 by entrepreneur, Colin Porter. The company officially launched on 15 January 2011 after receiving recognition and coverage on Australia's Nine Network television program A Current Affair (Australia).
Although initially self-funded, CreditorWatch secured an undisclosed amount of venture capital from Nightingale Ventures in January 2012.

In October 2017, CreditorWatch was acquired by InfoTrack, a Sydney-based, software as a service (SaaS) company.

6 December 2018 - Founder Colin Porter announces his departure from CreditorWatch at the end of December 2018. The business will be led by the current managing director Patrick Coghlan who will assume the role of CEO.

References

Sources 
 CreditorWatch exposes bad debtors for small business, by David Olsen, Dynamic Business, 5 November 2010.
 Dodgy debtors revealed, by Jo-Anne Hul, Smarter Business Ideas, 15 March 2011.
 New Credit Site Helping Small Business, Making Creditors Honest, by Rob Bates, Wentworth Courier, 27 April 2011.
 Spotting dodgy credit providers, by Oliver Milman, StartupSmart, 2 August 2011.
 Managing credit risks when dealing with SMEs, by Colin Porter, Credit Management in Australia, Volume 19, No.1 October 2011.

External links 
 
 CreditorWatch Credit Checks
 CreditorWatch Risk Monitor

Credit
Information systems
Finance in Australia